Highway Act (with its variations) is a stock short title used in India, the United Kingdom and the United States for legislation relating to highways.

India
The National Highways Act, 1956

United Kingdom
The Highways Act 1555
The Highways Act 1562
The Highways Act 1662
The Highway (Railway Crossings) Act 1839 (2 & 3 Vict c 45)
The Highways and Locomotives (Amendment) Act 1878
The Special Roads Act 1949
The Highways Act 1959 (7 & 8 Eliz 2 c 25)
The Highways (Miscellaneous Provisions) Act 1961 (9 & 10 Eliz 2 c 63)
The Highways (Amendment) Act 1965 (c 30)
The Highways Act 1971 (c 41)
The Highways Act 1980 (c 66)
The Highways (Amendment) Act 1986
The Highways (Obstruction by Body Corporate) Act 2004 (c 29)

The Highway Acts 1835 to 1885 was the collective title of the following Acts:
The Highway Act 1835 (5 & 6 Will 4 c 50)
The Highway Act 1862 (25 & 26 Vict c 61)
The Highway Act 1863 (26 & 27 Vict c 61)
The Highway Act 1864 (27 & 28 Vict c 101)
The Highways and Locomotives (Amendment) Act 1878 (41 & 42 Vict c 77)
The Highway Rate Assessment and Expenditure Act 1882 (45 & 46 Vict c 27)
The Highway Act Amendment Act 1885 (48 & 49 Vict c 13)

United States
 Federal Aid Highway Act of 1956
 Federal Aid Highway Act of 1973
 Federal-Aid Highway Act (disambiguation page)
 National Highway System Designation Act of 1995

See also
List of short titles

References

Lists of legislation by short title and collective title